Phallostethus is a small genus of fishes in the family Phallostethidae native to freshwater and brackish habitats in southeast Asia.

Species
The currently recognized species in this genus are:
 Phallostethus cuulong Shibukawa, Đ. Đ. Trần & X. L. Trần, 2012
 Phallostethus dunckeri Regan, 1913
 Phallostethus lehi Parenti, 1996

References

 
Phallostethinae
Taxa named by Charles Tate Regan
Taxonomy articles created by Polbot